This article is about the particular significance of the year 1823 to Wales and its people.

Incumbents
Lord Lieutenant of Anglesey – Henry Paget, 1st Marquess of Anglesey 
Lord Lieutenant of Brecknockshire – Henry Somerset, 6th Duke of Beaufort
Lord Lieutenant of Caernarvonshire – Thomas Assheton Smith
Lord Lieutenant of Cardiganshire – William Edward Powell
Lord Lieutenant of Carmarthenshire – George Rice, 3rd Baron Dynevor 
Lord Lieutenant of Denbighshire – Sir Watkin Williams-Wynn, 5th Baronet    
Lord Lieutenant of Flintshire – Robert Grosvenor, 1st Marquess of Westminster 
Lord Lieutenant of Glamorgan – John Crichton-Stuart, 2nd Marquess of Bute 
Lord Lieutenant of Merionethshire – Sir Watkin Williams-Wynn, 5th Baronet
Lord Lieutenant of Montgomeryshire – Edward Clive, 1st Earl of Powis
Lord Lieutenant of Pembrokeshire – Richard Philipps, 1st Baron Milford (until 28 November)
Lord Lieutenant of Radnorshire – George Rodney, 3rd Baron Rodney

Bishop of Bangor – Henry Majendie 
Bishop of Llandaff – William Van Mildert
Bishop of St Asaph – John Luxmoore 
Bishop of St Davids – Thomas Burgess

Events
13 January  – Edward Paget, former MP for Caernarvon, is appointed Commander-in-Chief of British forces in India.
23 January – In Paviland Cave on the Gower Peninsula, William Buckland discovers the "Red Lady of Paviland", the first identification of a prehistoric (male) human burial (first discovered on 21 December last).
February 
John Frost is sentenced to six months in prison for a libel against the town clerk of Newport.
Mercy Whitney describes the burial, in Hawaii, of the infant son of Isaac and Elizabeth Peke Davis: "A regular procession of two and two followed the corpse. Going into the fort in which the grave was dug seemed like entering a burying ground, more so than anything I have witnessed since I left America." 
4 March  – Llanuwchllyn-born John Richards is elected to the United States Congress.
26 March – The packet ship Alert sinks off The Skerries, Isle of Anglesey, with the loss of a hundred lives.
Summer – Stanley Embankment completed by Thomas Telford carrying the Holyhead road between Anglesey and Holy Island.
23 August – A major eisteddfod is held at Mold.
unknown date
The Welsh Literary Society of Brecon is established by Thomas Price (Carnhuanawc).
The Presbyterian Church of Wales draws up a "Confession of Faith" and becomes a separate body.
The Caergwrle Bowl, a decorated Middle Bronze Age artefact, is discovered.

Arts and literature

New books
Felicia Hemans – The Siege of Valencia
Huw Morys – Eos Ceiriog, sef casgliad o bêr ganiadau Huw Morus (posthumous, ed. Walter Davies)
Ioan Siencyn – Casgliad o Ganiadau Difyr (posthumous)

Music
David Charles – Hymnau ar Amrywiol Achosion (hymns)
John Ellis – Eliot (hymn tune)

Births
8 January – Alfred Russel Wallace, biologist (d. 1913)
11 February – Llewellyn Turner, politician (d. 1903)
March – Rowland Williams (Hwfa Môn), poet and archdruid (d. 1905)
19 April – Anna Laetitia Waring, poet and hymn-writer (d. 1910)
17 November – Sir John Evans, archaeologist (d. 1908)
December – Caroline Elizabeth Williams, radical and champion of women's rights (d. 1908)

Deaths
26 February – John Philip Kemble, actor, brother of Sarah Siddons, 66
11 November – Sir Richard Richards, politician and judge, 71
28 November – Richard Philipps, 1st Baron Milford, landowner, 79
30 November – William Joseph Williams, American painter of Welsh parentage, 64
4 December – John Ryland Harris (Ieuan Ddu), printer, 20

References

 
Wales
Wales